List of Vice Chancellors of the University of Kashmir.

The Vice Chancellors are as follows:

References

Lists of academic chancellors and vice chancellors